Eva Gray may refer to:
 Eva Gray (actress) (born 1970), English actress
 Eva Gray (cricketer) (born 2000), English cricketer